Prague Autumn International Music Festival (1991–2008) was the second largest classical music festival in Prague held annually in Prague Rudolfinum in September. It was organised under the auspices of Václav Klaus, president of the Czech Republic  and was co-produced by the City of Prague.

The Dvořák Prague International Music Festival is a major music festival held in autumn since 2008 in Prague Rudolfinum. The festival focusses on music of the Romantic period, but also extends back into the classical period, and forwards to the twentieth and twenty-first centuries.

History
The history of the Autumn Festival began soon after the Velvet revolution. Many performers from all over the world have appeared at the festival. In 14 years, 66 orchestras, 96 conductors, 122 singers, 53 pianists, 31 violin players, 24 cellists, 16 choirs, 6 chamber ensembles, and 23 other instrumentalists performed. The number of attendees approaches 270 000, plus millions of radio listeners all around the world and domestic TV viewers.

Stars of the festival
Israel Philharmonic Orchestra with Zubin Mehta
Bruckner Orchester Linz
RSO Wien with Bertrand de Billy
Moscow Philharmonic Orchestra with Yuri Simonov
Filarmonica della Scala with Riccardo Muti
Beethoven Orchester Bonn
State Symphony Capella of Russia with Valeri Polyansky
Royal Liverpool Philharmonic Orchestra
Budapest Festival Orchestra with Iván Fischer
Mariinsky Theatre Orchestra with Valeri Gergiev
BBC Scottish Symphony Orchestra and Ilan Volkov
BBC Philharmonic under Gianandrea Noseda
Bamberger Symphoniker with Jonathan Nott
Among the chamber orchestra belong English and Scottish Chamber Orchestra, London Brass Virtuosi, City of London Sinfonia, Sinfonia Varsovia with Krzysztof Penderecki or Orchestre de chambre de Paris with John Nelson.

Conductors and soloists:
Marin Alsop,
Semyon Bychkov,
James DePreist,
Iván Fischer,
Valery Gergiev,
Marek Janowski,
Zubin Mehta,
Riccardo Muti,
Gianandrea Noseda,
Jonathan Nott,
Krzysztof Penderecki,
Ilan Volkov,
Maxim Fedotov,
Vadim Gluzman,
Leonidas Kavakos,
Shlomo Mintz,
Vadim Repin,
Isaac Stern,
Steven Isserlis,
Boris Pergamenschikow,
Heinrich Schiff,
Yefim Bronfman,
Barry Douglas,
Hélène Grimaud,
Arcadi Volodos,
Gábor Boldoczki,
Galina Gorchakova.

See also
 Designblok

References

External links
Prague Autumn Web Site
Prague Music Festival opened by Czech-Canadian pianist

Music festivals established in 1991
Music in Prague
Classical music festivals in the Czech Republic
Festivals in Prague
1991 establishments in Czechoslovakia
Autumn events in the Czech Republic